Philereme is a genus of moths in the family Geometridae erected by Jacob Hübner in 1825. It is the only genus in tribe Phileremini.

Species
 Philereme neglectata (Staudinger, 1892)
 Philereme senescens (Staudinger, 1892)
 Philereme transversata (Hufnagel, 1767)
 Philereme vetulata (Denis & Schiffermüller, 1775)

References

Larentiinae
Taxa named by Jacob Hübner